Mastax nepalensis is a species of beetle in the family Carabidae with restricted distribution in the Nepal.

References

Mastax nepalensis
Beetles of Asia
Beetles described in 1977